Tetradactylus africanus, commonly known as the eastern long-tailed seps or African whip lizard, is a species of lizard in the family Gerrhosauridae.
The species is found in South Africa and Eswatini.

References

Tetradactylus
Reptiles described in 1838
Fauna of South Africa
Taxa named by John Edward Gray